The 2019 Cotabato earthquakes were an earthquake swarm which struck the province of Cotabato on the island of Mindanao in the Philippines in October 2019. Three of these earthquakes were above 6.0 on the moment magnitude scale with a Mercalli intensity of VIII. More than 40 people have been reported dead or missing and nearly 800 were injured as a result of these events.

Tectonic setting 
Mindanao lies across the complex convergent boundary between the Sunda Plate and the Philippine Sea Plate. Part of the oblique convergence between these plates is taken up by subduction along the Cotabato Trench. The strike-slip component of the convergence is accommodated partly by the Philippine Fault System and partly by the Cotabato Fault System, a network of mainly NW-SE trending sinistral (left-lateral) strike-slip faults that form the boundary between the Cotabato Arc and the Central Mindanao Volcanic Belt. In the area of the October 2019 earthquakes series, the individual faults include the NW-SE trending South Columbio Fault, North Columbio Fault, M'Lang Fault, Makilala–Malungon Fault and Tangbulan Fault, and the SW-NE trending Makilala Fault and Balabag Fault.

Earthquakes M≥5.0

Major earthquakes

October 16 
The Philippine Institute of Volcanology and Seismology (PHIVOLCS) reported that an earthquake of 6.3 magnitude was recorded at 19:37 PST (UTC+8) with a depth of 10.0 km kilometers (recorded as 6.4  at a depth of 12.8 km by the USGS). The epicenter was 7 kilometers ENE of Columbio, 22 kilometers southeast of Tulunan, Cotabato where the earthquake was felt at Intensity VII. VII was also reached at M'lang and Kidapawan. Intensity VI was reached at Tacurong, Santo Niño in South Cotabato, and Digos in Davao del Sur. The earthquake was a result of sinistral movement on a NW-SE trending strike-slip fault.

Philippine government seismologist Renato Solidum described the quake as "moderately powerful". The National Tsunami Center issues a statement saying no present tsunami threat from the earthquake.

Three malls in Davao City reported damage following the earthquake. In General Santos, the Gaisano Mall was mostly gutted following a fire triggered by the earthquake. 143 buildings were damaged and one was destroyed. The damaged buildings included 40 houses, 70 schools, 7 health facilities, 10 commercial buildings, and 2 places of worship.

October 29 
On October 29, 2019, a 6.6-magnitude earthquake struck the island of Mindanao in the Philippines at a depth of 14.0 km, according to the USGS, and 7 km according to PHIVOLCS. The maximum perceived shaking was VII on both the PEIS and MMS scales. This intensity was reached in Tulunan, Makilala, Kidapawan City, Digos, and Malungon. This earthquake was caused by movement on a different, but related, strike-slip fault to the October 16 event.

Magnitude 6.6

A major fire broke out in General Santos. There were power outages in many parts of Cotabato and locally in South Cotabato, Sultan Kudarat, and Sarangani. At least ten deaths were reported, with a minimum of another four hundred injured. The fatalities were reported in Arakan, Carmen, Tulunan, Makilala, Digos, and Magsaysay. School classes were suspended in parts of North Cotabato, South Cotabato, and Sultan Kudarat.

October 31 
On October 31, 2019, a 6.5 magnitude earthquake struck the island of Mindanao in the Philippines at a depth of 10 km according to the USGS, with the epicenter located 1 km south of Kisante. A maximum perceived shaking of VII (PEIS) was reported from Tulunan, Makilala, Kidapawan City, Santa Cruz, Matanao, Magsaysay, Bansalan and Digos. Some buildings in Davao and Soccksargen were seriously damaged and some collapsed. The death toll of these two quakes (October 29 and 31) was raised to 24, with 563 people injured, and 11 still missing. More than 300 aftershocks were recorded after the earthquake.

Magnitude 6.5

A hotel in Kidapawan City collapsed following the earthquake; fortunately, according National Disaster Risk Reduction and Management Council (NDRRMC), no one was inside in the building when the earthquake struck. The Davao City government suspended the classes on all levels. Affected residents in Makilala, Cotabato have begged on the highway for basic needs such as rice and tents. According to the NDRRMC, about 30,000 families or 150,000 individuals affected by the earthquake.

December 15

The Cotabato sequence was followed by an earthquake, with a magnitude of  6.8 (ANSS) or  6.9 (PHIVOLCS), on December 15 at 14:11 PST with an epicenter in the neighboring province of Davao del Sur. It had a hypocentral depth of between 22.4 km (ANSS) and 3.0 km (PHIVOLCS) and a maximum felt intensity of VII MMI or VII PEIS. The greatest damage was reported from the towns of Matanao, Magsaysay, Hagonoy and Padada. The earthquake caused 13 deaths and a further 210 people were injured.

Landslides
The earthquake sequence triggered a large number of landslides and rockslides. Municipalities affected by landslides include Kidapawan City, Antipas, Arakan, Makilala, M'Lang and Tulunan in Cotabato province; Magsaysay, Bansalan, Malalag, Matanao and Kiblawan in Davao Del Sur. Three fatalities were caused by landslides triggered by the October 29 shock with a further six people reported missing. Two fatalities were caused by landslides triggered by the October 31 shock, with a further five people reported missing.

Effects on infrastructure

Reactions

International

The US Ambassador to the Philippines, Sung Kim, and the EU delegation to the Philippines both offered their condolences to the Filipino people. Chinese Foreign Minister Wang Yi also sent his message of sympathy to Philippine Foreign Secretary Teodoro Locsin Jr. The Chinese government has donated ¥3 million yuan (roughly equivalent to ₱22 million pesos) to support the disaster relief efforts in Mindanao. Meanwhile, the Spanish Consulate in the Philippines pledged to donate up to 35,000 euros to the International Federation of Red Cross and Red Crescent Societies and 70,000 euros to assist people in water, hygiene and sanitation.

Domestic
The Provincial Government of South Cotabato, Sarangani and the City of General Santos was one of the first to initiate to help the citizens with blankets, trapal, food and water near the epicenter of the earthquake swarm, most especially in the Municipalities of Makilala, Tulunan, M'lang and City of Kidapawan. Local citizens in Soccsksargen acted in both giving donations in the government processes and privately giving donations across the highway in Makilala, Tulunan and Kidapawan. The Davao City Government also helped the affected areas. The Island Garden City of Samal Government also went to Cotabato Province to give relief goods and drinking water. The Bangsamoro Government also went to the affected areas to give relief goods. The municipal government of Datu Saudi Ampatuan  also went to the area to share donations to help the affected people. Among other institutions that immediately helped where banks, malls, universities and schools in Soccsksargen and Davao Region to assist their fellow Mindanaoans in crisis.

See also 
List of earthquakes in 2019
List of earthquakes in the Philippines
2019 Luzon earthquake
2019 Visayas earthquake

References

External links
 (October 16, M 6.3)
 (October 29, M 6.6)
 (October 31, M 6.5)
 (Covers all three earthquakes)

2019 disasters in the Philippines
2019 earthquakes
Earthquakes in the Philippines
Earthquake clusters, swarms, and sequences
History of Cotabato
October 2019 events in the Philippines